Mercer Area High School is a high school located in Mercer, Pennsylvania, United States. The school's colors are navy blue and white. The school mascot is the Mercer Mustang.

Notable alumni
Gary Peters, professional baseball player
Trent Reznor, singer and songwriter

References

Schools in Mercer County, Pennsylvania
Public high schools in Pennsylvania